Prowlers of the Sea is a 1928 American silent adventure film directed by John G. Adolfi and starring Carmel Myers, Ricardo Cortez and George Fawcett. It is based on Jack London's story The Siege of the Lancashire Queen.

Cast
 Carmel Myers as Mercedes  
 Ricardo Cortez as Carlos De Neve  
 George Fawcett as General Hernández  
 Gino Corrado as The Skipper  
 Frank Lackteen as Ramón Sánchez  
 Frank Leigh as Felipe  
 Shirley Palmer as Cuban Maid

References

Bibliography
 Dan Van Neste. The Magnificent Heel: The Life and Films of Ricardo Cortez. BearManor Media, 2017.

External links

1928 films
1928 adventure films
American adventure films
Films based on works by Jack London
Films directed by John G. Adolfi
American silent feature films
Tiffany Pictures films
Films set in Cuba
American black-and-white films
1920s English-language films
1920s American films
Silent adventure films